Victor Popescu (1886–1970) was an officer in the Romanian army and a guerrilla warrior during the World War I occupation of Romania.

Early life

He was born in Valea cu Apă - Fărcășești, Gorj, the son of school teacher Dumitru Popescu. He attended the Normal School in Bucharest to become a teacher himself. After completing his studies he performed military service in the 18th Infantry Regiment Gorj, then returned to Valea cu Apă where he took his father's position.

Participation in World War I

At the beginning of 1916 he was concentrated in the army and followed a training course at the 21st Dorobanti Regiment in Bucharest. At the day Romania entered World War I on August 15, 1916, he was enlisted in the 18th Infantry Regiment under the command of Colonel Constantine Jipa. He commanded, at the rank of second lieutenant, platoon 3, of the third company of battalion I of this regiment. With his unit he participated in the Transylvanian campaign in 1916, fighting in the Jiu Gorge.

He was wounded while fighting North of the city of Lupeni. After recovering, he returns to the command of his platoon.

On 5 November 1916, near Țicleni, most of the 18th Infantry Regiment, together with other Romanian regiments, was surrounded by the enemy and forced to surrender. Not wanting to fall prisoner, Popescu flees in the forests, trying to reach the Romanian tropes he was separated from. He urges his soldiers to do the same in order to avoid capture and internment in prison camps.

Together with his company commander, Captain Gheorghe Gutuleanu and with sergeant Costea Aristica, he wandered for three days through the forests between Rășina and Brătuia, to Vlăduleni village, where the three separated. Victor Popescu tried to reach a Romanian detachment that he knew he was withdrawing to Turnu-Severin, but failed to find it, so he returned to his native village.

Formation of the guerrilla group

When he arrived home, he found out that the Germans plundered his home and tortured his father. On December 4, 1916 he killed the two responsible German soldiers, then killed the German sentinel at the headquarters of the German patrol, taking his gun and ammunition. From this point on, Popescu decides to becomes a guerrilla warrior to oppose the German occupant.

From the people in the village, he learned that his former company commander, captain Gutuleanu, was captured by the Germans and sent to the Sopronnyék prison camp in Austro-Hungary. He also learned that a local blacksmith named Hans, and villager Gheorghe Schism, were betraying him to the Germans. In response, Victor Popescu begins to assemble a partisan group to fight the Germans, within the areas of Gorj and Mehedinți. His comrades were brothers Dumitru and Ilie Cârciumaru, Iorgu Crăciun, Vasile Velican, M. Cărămidaru, all from Negomir, Nicolae Popescu, Tudor Popescu from Valea cu Apă, Gheorghe Ioana from Racovița, sergeant gendarme, Gheorghe Spătaru, from Negomir village, Ionel Popescu normalist and scout student, Ionel Prunescu, a student at the military school in Craiova, as well as escaped prisoners of war from the prisoners' camp in Turnu-Severin, Italians Alfredo Pellegrini and Dominico Prade, and some Russian escaped POWs.

The number of those who joined him in the first phase of the guerrilla battle was between forty and one hundred and twenty combatants.

The number of members of the group varied over time, increasing in the case of attacks, and declining when the enemy started to follow the partisans. The combatants were dressed in Romanian military or civilian uniforms, while the former Russian and Italian prisoners wear the uniforms as where they were captured by the Germans. As weapons they had rifles and machine guns leftover by the Romanian army during the retreat or, capture weapons taken from the Central Powers troops.

The actions of the guerrilla group
In the incursions made in the villages of the counties of Gorj and Mehedinti, Victor Popescu's group of partisans left, for misleading the enemy, leaflets addressed to the occupation forces, with the following content:

"Today I passed through your village, I saw the miseries that you do to our brethren, we will soon pay you miserable what you are." Tickets were signed with the names of senior Romanian officers, including General Alexandru Averescu, to suggest to the Germans that they are confronted with a large and well-organized Romanian force.

The actions of the guerrilla group were diverse, ranging from assault with firearms to spreading manifestations that would mislead the opponents or intimidate them. On several occasions, in the villages of Corcova and Meris, Victor Popescu, disguised as a monk, spoke to the German patrols, drunk them, and took their weapons and ammunition while they were unconscious of too much drink.

Besides, the Romanian sub-lieutenant walked through disguised villages in various forms: priest, carriage, pot-seller and others.

In May 1917, Victor Popescu launched a Proclamation addressed to Romanians, village mayors and Romanian soldiers remaining behind the enemy front, urging them to fight with their gun and warning the Romanian traitors that they would be punished if they would enemy information.

The Central Powers' occupation forces organized guerrilla arrests, mostly based on information provided by Romanian traitors. A reward was placed on Victor Popescu's head, amounting to 5,000 to 30,000 lei, depending on the value of the information that will lead to its capture. The enemy's injuries were mostly with no results, he suffered losses as a result of clashes with Romanian partisans. In some of these raids, the German patrols were able to capture two former Italian prisoners who fought alongside Victor Popescu, Alfredo Pellegrini and Dominico Prade. In others, they succeeded in killing some Romanian fighters, such as Ionel Prunescu and Gheorghe Ioana. Victor Popescu himself will be hurt in one of these struggles, but he will be able to save himself without being captured.

Among those who betrayed the group of Romanian partisans were Gheorghe Schinteie, Mayor of Dragotesti commune, Gheorghe Roşoga, priest in the village of Peşteana de Jos and Aftanghel Toma, monk. Gheorghe Schinteie will be shot dead by Victor Popescu as he led a Hungarian patrol to catch him.

Aftanghel Toma betrayed Ionel Popescu, a member of the group of partisans, who was captured by the Austro-Hungarian troops and closed to the Raci village. Victor Popescu attacked the command and freed Ionel. A commando made up of partisans abducted the monk on the night of May 30/31, 1917 and after an interrogation he was executed by shooting, leaving a note near his dead body with the text: "so will all who betray their brethren and stand in the service of the enemy."

Other actions of the partisans include attacking enemy ammunition depots, blowing up a train of ammunition loaded with ammunition, and attacks on the Central Powers' troops, including those stationed the city of Târgu Jiu.

Because they have not been able to catch them even by betrayal, the military authorities of the occupation forces have resorted to reprisals on the families of guerrilla warriors. Victor Popescu's father, wife, sister and father-in-law were arrested, sentenced to death, and some of them executed by the enemy. Victor Popescu's house, in the village of Valea cu Apă, was spoiled and burnt on 24 June 1917, on the order of General von Knalzer. The house of  Victor Popescu's father-in-law, N.D. Pleşan from the village of Crânguieşti, Mehedinţi County, was also robbed and burnt.

From the villages of Valea cu Apă, Negomir, Grozeşti, Covrigi, Pestera de Sus, Bolboşi, Slivileşti, Stejerei, Rovinari, Horăşti, Samarineşti, Trestioara and others, hundreds of people were suspected of helping the partisans. They were locked at Turnu-Severin, and ten of them sentenced to death. Learning about the death sentence the people who helped him, Victor Popescu decides to attack the prison in Turnu-Severin to release the detainees who supported him. The partisan group attacked the prison on the night of July 6/7, 1917 and managed to break into its walls, whereby some of the prisoners manage to flee. Those sentenced to death, however, did not escape, and the attack on the prison hastened their execution by the Germans. On July 10, 1917, ten supporters of Victor Popescu were executed by firing squad after being forced to dig their own graves.  These were Nicolae Marcu from Dragotesti, Nicolae Popescu, teacher from Covrigi, brother of Victor and father of Ionel Popescu, Constantin Cojocaru, notary in Negomir commune, Ion Norocea, Bolboşi, Petre Vâlceanu and Ion Brăiescu, mayor and notar of Bolboşi commune, Stancu Croitoru, Tudor Ungureanu, Ilie Giumanca, all from Grozeşti and Mihai Cernăianu from Horăşti.

Another eight men, both men and women, were sentenced to imprisonment, with penalties ranging from one to fifteen years. Several other dozens of people were imprisoned at the Tismana monastery, and ten were deported to Bulgaria. Either in prison or shortly after being released from detention, some died due to ill-treatment. Among them are the father of Victor Popescu, Dumitru, and the sister-in-law, Domnica, the wife of Nicolae Popescu, executed by the Germans on July 10, 1917.

In August 1917, the group of partisans dissolved, most of whom returned to their homes. Victor Popescu passed to the counties of Olt and Vâlcea, gathered a new group of five or six people, who went to Moldova in February when Victor Popescu arrived in Moldova at his regiment.

After World War I

At the end of 1918, after the end of the war, he returned to his native village where he resumed his teaching career.

In 1941 he was decorated with the "Reward of Labor" medal for outstanding merits as a teacher, reviewer and school inspector. He retired in 1943.

In 1948 Victor Popescu was fined for "propaganda against the regime" by the newly established communist authorities in the country. The one who denounced him to the authorities was the same priest Gheorghe Roşoga, who in 1917 sold him to the Germans.

In 1952 he was arrested by Communists and detained for one year at the Ghencea camp in Bucharest. The same authorities annulled their pension entitlement for the period 1948-1956, on the ground that they had been punished under Decree 102 of 1948. It was reinstated in 1956.

Victor Popescu dies in 1970 at the age of 84, being buried in the native village cemetery.

In 1986, historical film "Batalia din Umbra" based on Victor Popescu's guerrilla actions during the First World War was cast.

In 1996, the school in Valea cu Apa receives the name "Victor Popescu".

References

1886 births
1970 deaths
Romanian military personnel of World War I